Anuar Loitiptip was a Kenyan politician who was the senator for Lamu County, from 2017 — 2022.

References 

Living people
Members of the Senate of Kenya
Year of birth missing (living people)